Arvilla is an unincorporated community in Pleasants County, West Virginia, United States. The community's post office no longer exists.

References 

Unincorporated communities in West Virginia
Unincorporated communities in Pleasants County, West Virginia